Marathon Technologies Corp. was founded by senior executives and engineers responsible for developing Digital Equipment Corporation's VAXft fault-tolerant systems. The team used this experience to create the first software and networking technology that allowed multiple Windows/Intel servers to operate as a single fault-tolerant system.

Marathon Technologies migrated its technology in 2004 to a software-only product named everRun that works with standard off-the-shelf x86 Intel and AMD servers with Windows Server 2003 and unmodified Windows applications. 

In 2007, Marathon Technologies announced its v-Available product initiative, designed to fill the gap in the market for effective high availability software for server virtualization. In the spring of 2008 the company released everRun VM for Citrix XenServer the first in the series of v-Available products from Marathon Technologies that provides fault-tolerant high availability and disaster recovery protection. 

In late 2010, Marathon released everRun MX, the industry's first software-based fault tolerant solution for symmetric multiprocessing (SMP) and multi-core servers and applications.

Marathon Technologies is headquartered in Littleton, MA, United States with additional offices in the United States, Europe and Asia. Marathon Technologies has taken venture funding from Atlas Venture, Longworth Venture Partners and venture capital firm Sierra Ventures.

Marathon Technologies was acquired by Stratus in September 2012.

References

External links 
 Official Website
 Official Blog
 24/7 Uptime - UK elite partner
 Stratus acquisition

Companies established in 1993
Software companies based in Massachusetts
Defunct software companies of the United States